Cristian Souza España (born 28 August 1995) is a Uruguayan professional footballer who plays as a midfielder for Swiss club Bellinzona.

Career
As a youth player, Souza joined the youth academy of Uruguayan second division side Central Español. Souza started his career with Rentistas in the Uruguayan top flight, where he made 16 league appearances. On 18 October 2015, Souza debuted for Rentistas in a 1–0 defeat to Peñarol.

Before the 2019 season, he signed for Peruvian club Cusco, where he received interest from Universitario (Peru). Before the second half of 2019–20, he signed for Mexican outfit Pachuca. Before the 2021 season, Souza signed for Cerro Largo in the Uruguayan top flight. In 2021, he signed for Swiss third division side Bellinzona.

References

External links
 
 

1995 births
Living people
Footballers from Montevideo
Uruguayan footballers
Association football midfielders
C.A. Rentistas players
Danubio F.C. players
Sud América players
Liverpool F.C. (Montevideo) players
Cusco FC footballers
C.F. Pachuca players
Cerro Largo F.C. players
AC Bellinzona players
Uruguayan Primera División players
Peruvian Primera División players
Liga MX players
Uruguayan expatriate footballers
Uruguayan expatriate sportspeople in Peru
Uruguayan expatriate sportspeople in Mexico
Uruguayan expatriate sportspeople in Switzerland
Expatriate footballers in Peru
Expatriate footballers in Mexico
Expatriate footballers in Switzerland